Sharb-e Mah (also Romanized as Shārb-e Māh, Shārb Māh, and Shāreb Māh; also known as Shāh Darreh, Shāh Dowrmeh, Shāh Durmah, Shārb-e Māgh, and Shārīmā) is a village in Golashkerd Rural District, in the Central District of Faryab County, Kerman Province, Iran. At the 2006 census, its population was 146, in 30 families.

References 

Populated places in Faryab County